Dereağzı is a village in the District of Nazilli, Aydın Province, Turkey. As of 2010, it had a population of 264 people.

2021 Dereağzı Earthquake
In late 2021, the village suffered a major earthquake resulting in a massive loss of life. It was recorded that 43 were killed, and an additional 193 people were injured during the disaster. Major news publications of the disaster recorded that nearly 65% of the village was destroyed.

References

Villages in Nazilli District